Thomas Exum Sr. (born June 16, 1952) is an American politician who is a Democratic member of the Colorado Senate. He represents District 11, which includes all or parts of Colorado Springs, Cimarron Hills and Stratmoor in El Paso County. Previously, Exum served in the Colorado House of Representatives, representing the 17th district from 2013 to 2015 and again from 2017 to 2013.

Early life and education
Thomas Exum Sr. was born in Raleigh, North Carolina, on June 16, 1952. He graduated from the University of Southern Colorado with a Bachelor of Science degree in 1994. He worked as a firefighter for thirty-five years are worked as a battalion chief.

Colorado House of Representatives

Elections

Exum received the Democratic nomination to run for a seat in the Colorado House of Representatives from the 17th district in the 2012 election. He defeated Republican nominee Mark H. Barker, Libertarian nominee Susan Quilleash, and American Constitution nominee Barry Forest Pace in the election.

Republican nominee Catherine Roupe defeated Exum in the 2014 election. During the 2016 election he was endorsed by President Barack Obama and defeated Roupe and Quilleash in the general election. He won reelection in the 2018 election against Roupe. He defeated Republican nominee Rob Blancken and Libertarian nominee Quilleash in the 2020 election.

During the 2022 election Exum won the Democratic nomination for a seat in the Colorado Senate against Yolanda Avila. In the general election, Exum defeated Republican Sen. Dennis Hisey.

Tenure
During Exum's tenure in the state house he served as chair of the Government committee and served on the Education, and Transportation and Local committees.

Electoral history

References

External links
Official page at the Colorado General Assembly

21st-century American politicians
Democratic Party Colorado state senators
African-American state legislators in Colorado
American firefighters
Living people
Democratic Party members of the Colorado House of Representatives
Politicians from Colorado Springs, Colorado
1952 births
21st-century African-American politicians
20th-century African-American people